The French gunboat Légère was a felucca that the French Navy commissioned in August 1794 at Toulon. The Royal Navy captured her in September 1798 and took her into service as HMS Legere. The Royal Navy disposed of her by 1803.

Capture
On 22 August  captured Légère, of two 6-pounder guns and some swivel guns, and 61 men, off  Alexandria. Captain George Johnstone Hope of Alcmene tried to board her before her captain could throw overboard any dispatches she was carrying for Napoleon Bonaparte, then in Egypt. Hope was unsuccessful, but two seamen from Alcmenes crew jumped overboard and were able to retrieve the dispatches before they sank. One of Alcemenes boats was able to rescue the intrepid seamen. At the time of her capture, Légère had been 40 days out of Toulon. The Royal Navy took the gunboat into service as HMS Legere

Royal Navy service and fate
There is no record that Legere was ever commissioned. However, in 1799 she was under the command of Lieutenant George Langford. She was still under his command on 11 September 1800, and serving on the Lisbon, Gibraltar, and Mediterranean station. She was in service in the Mediterranean in 1801, but was disposed of by 1803.

Citations

References
  
 

Gunboats of the French Navy
Captured ships
Ships of the Royal Navy